Old Platte Clove Post Office is a historic post office building located at Elka Park in Greene County, New York.  It was built about 1885 and is a light wood balloon frame Victorian-era "T" shaped structure that served a residence and post office.  It was used as a residence and post office from 1888 to 1911.

It was listed on the National Register of Historic Places in 2005.

References

Post office buildings on the National Register of Historic Places in New York (state)
Government buildings completed in 1885
Buildings and structures in Greene County, New York
National Register of Historic Places in Greene County, New York